The Japan women's national under-18 and under-19 basketball team is the national basketball team of Japan  and is governed by the Japan  Basketball Association.
 
It represents the country in international under-19 and under-18 (under age 19 and under age 18) women's basketball competitions.

At the 2019 FIBA Under-19 Women's Basketball World Cup, Japan finished 8th out of 16 overall. The team displayed some strong showings including its game against eventual bronze medalist Spain, where Japan won two of the four quarters.

See also
Japan women's national basketball team
Japan women's national under-17 basketball team
Japan men's national under-19 basketball team

References

Women's national under-19 basketball teams
Basketball